Akbarabad-e Now Kan (also Romanized as Akbarābād-e Now Kan; also known as Akbarābād and Akbarābād-e Chāh Qal‘eh) is a village in Golestan Rural District, in the Central District of Sirjan County, Kerman Province, Iran. At the 2006 census, its population was 19, in 5 families.

References 

Populated places in Sirjan County